York College for Girls was a girls' school in York, England, founded in 1908 and closed in 1997. 

The school was founded by the Church Schools Company (later the United Church Schools Trust) and opened with twelve pupils on 24 January 1908 in Low Petergate, York, in a building dating to around 1725. By 1997, the school had about 200 pupils and was in the same buildings with later extensions.

In 1996, there were reports of a "cash crisis" and the school closed in 1997.

The buildings are grade II* listed, and after the school closed they became the home of the restaurant  ("the old school" in Italian), which is still in operation.

Former pupils
Notable former pupils include:
Dame Janet Baker (born 1933), singer
Margaret Mann Phillips (1906–1987), historian
Mary Isolen Fergusson (1914–1997), civil engineer
Claudia Lawrence (born 1974), long term missing person

References

External links

Further reading

Girls' schools in North Yorkshire
Defunct schools in York
Defunct girls' schools in the United Kingdom
1908 establishments in England
Educational institutions established in 1908
1997 disestablishments in England
Educational institutions disestablished in 1997
Grade II* listed buildings in York
Grade II* listed schools
Petergate